Electric is the third album by British rock band the Cult, released in 1987. It was the follow-up to their commercial breakthrough Love. The album equalled its predecessor's chart placing by peaking at number four in the UK but exceeded its chart residency, spending a total of 27 weeks on the chart (the most successful run for an album by The Cult).

The album marked a deliberate stylistic change in the band's sound from gothic rock to more traditional hard rock. Rick Rubin, the producer on Electric, had been specifically hired to remake the band's sound in an effort to capitalize on the popularity of hard rock and heavy metal in the 1980s. The album was featured in the book 1001 Albums You Must Hear Before You Die.

In 2013 the album was re-released as a double CD set under the title Electric Peace, with one disc featuring the originally released album and the second containing the entire Peace album recorded during the Manor Sessions.

Production
After the breakthrough success of their second album, Love, the Cult began working on a follow-up with producer Steve Brown. In the summer of 1986, they recorded twelve tracks at the Manor Studio in Oxfordshire. These recordings, which came to be known as the Manor Sessions, were to make up a new album, tentatively entitled Peace. However upon completion of the recording sessions, the band decided that they were unhappy with the sound, and began to look for a new producer.

The band went on to choose Rick Rubin, who was known for producing albums for hip hop artists and thrash metal band Slayer. These new recordings, with a slightly different track-list and running order, became the album that was released. Engineer Tony Platt recalled that Rubin used AC/DC as a benchmark for the album's sound:

Although all twelve of the Manor Sessions tracks were initially scrapped, four of them would turn up as B-sides to singles from Electric. A further five of them appeared on a limited edition EP, and with the release of Rare Cult in 2000, the rest of the unreleased Steve Brown-produced tracks were made available, albeit in a limited edition format. They were finally made available on a mainstream release in 2013 as part of the Electric Peace release.

Critical reception

Rolling Stone wrote that "despite the hovering shades of Zeppelin, Bon Scott and others, Electric does more than pilfer bygone metal mayhem. It swaggers, crunches and howls, all right, but it does so with irreverence (not surprising with raunch expert Rick Rubin behind the board)." Trouser Press wrote: "As sensually gratifying as it is cornball retro-moronic, Electric can lay claim to one of history's worst versions of 'Born to Be Wild.'"

Track listing
All songs written by Ian Astbury and Billy Duffy, except where noted.
 "Wild Flower" – 3:37
 "Peace Dog" – 3:34
 "Lil' Devil" – 2:44
 "Aphrodisiac Jacket" – 4:11
 "Electric Ocean" – 2:49
 "Bad Fun" – 3:33
 "King Contrary Man" – 3:12
 "Love Removal Machine" – 4:17
 "Born to Be Wild" (Mars Bonfire) – 3:55
 "Outlaw" – 2:52
 "Memphis Hip Shake" – 4:01

"Manor Sessions"/Peace track listing
Electric arose from the sessions for the unreleased Peace album. Electric featured several rerecorded songs from the Peace sessions. Tracks 2, 5, 6 and 10 below first appeared on The Manor Sessions EP in 1988. Tracks 7, 8, 9 and 11 were issued as B-sides to singles from Electric in 1987. The full Peace album was not released in its entirety until 2000, when it was included as Disc 3 of the Rare Cult boxed set. In 2013, the Peace album was released as part of a two-disc set alongside Electric, under the title Electric Peace.

 "Love Removal Machine" - 5:16
 "Wild Flower" - 4:10
 "Peace Dog" - 5:09
 "Aphrodisiac Jacket" - 4:25
 "Electric Ocean" - 4:13
 "Bad Fun" - 6:24
 "Conquistador" - 2:53
 "Zap City" - 5:15
 "Love Trooper" - 3:55
 "Outlaw" - 5:07
 "Groove Co." - 4:13

Personnel
The Cult
Ian Astbury – vocals
Billy Duffy – guitar
Jamie Stewart – bass guitar
Les Warner – drums

Charts

Certifications

References 

1987 albums
The Cult albums
Albums produced by Rick Rubin
Beggars Banquet Records albums